Hugo Olson Lilliér (3 October 1894 – 30 May 1973) was a Swedish track and field athlete who competed in the 1920 Summer Olympics and in the 1924 Summer Olympics. In 1920 he finished tenth in the javelin throw competition. Four years later he finished 13th in the javelin throw event.

References

External links
profile 

1894 births
1973 deaths
Swedish male javelin throwers
Olympic athletes of Sweden
Athletes (track and field) at the 1920 Summer Olympics
Athletes (track and field) at the 1924 Summer Olympics